Chris Christenson (born May 14, 1973, Whittier, CA) is an American surfboard shaper, craftsman, and outdoor enthusiast.

Background
Born and raised in Southern California, Chris' passion for surfing began at a young age. When Chris wasn't surfing the local beach breaks between Seal Beach and Newport Beach, he was exploring the snow at his grandparents' cabin in the San Bernardino mountains, or was teeing up on the Long Beach Navy golf course. Growing up, Chris would often watch his next door neighbor shape surfboards in his garage, but it wasn't until Chris was 18 and on a golf/academic scholarship at Point Loma Nazarene University that he bought his first surfboard blank, borrowed his neighbor's tools, and shaped his first board – a moment that would forever propel him down a path of most resistance.

Shaping career
In 1992, Chris' shaping career began with a six-year apprenticeship to shaping legend, Dick Brewer (1936-2022). It was perfecting the skill of shaping boards under Brewer, and the influence of his then neighbor, Skip Frye, that solidified Chris' abilities to design and shape any size surfboard, which would later open the door to shaping big wave guns for the world's best big wave surfers. Chris' boards were ridden by legendary big wave surfer Greg Long through two big wave world titles, wins at the 2008 Mavericks surf contest  and 2009 Quiksilver In Memory of Eddie Aikau big-wave contest, and multiple  XXL awards. Ian Walsh took home the 2018 Ride of the Year and Tube of the Year at the WSL Big Wave Awards for a massive wave he rode on a Christenson board to win the Pe’ahi Challenge in 2017. A reputation for being a punk rock, forward thinker, with a connection to the past, Chris shapes everything from daggers to fish shapes for an elite customer base that includes top surfers worldwide to pro baseball and football stars, rock musicians and surfers on all sorts of waves and with unique style who appreciate handcrafted design. Christenson Surfboards currently offers 30 different models, along with endless custom designs created by Chris.

In 2012, Chris acquired Moonlight Glassing, which is now located next to Christenson Surfboards in San Marcos, CA. Moonlight Glassing is a legendary shop in the southern California surfboard crafting world. Christenson boards are glassed at Moonlight along with dozens of other shapers' surfboards.

Snow-Surf Crossover
Chris' passion for the outdoors is as deep-rooted as it can be in Southern California. When he wasn't in school or surfing, Chris spent every free moment of his childhood at his grandparents' cabin in the San Bernardino mountains. Feeling the congruity between snowboarding and surfing, Chris' passion didn't end on the mountain. Through the surf industry and snowboarding, Chris became close friends with famed big mountain rider, Jeremy Jones. Based on their love of backcountry snowboarding and surfing, Chris and Jeremy began a collaboration to create a snowboard that captured the congruence of snowboarding and surfing. Born of Chris and Jeremy's surf/design partnership was the well-received 'storm chaser' - a swallowtail with a surfboard rocker and the ability for tight turns on groomers or in the deepest powder. From the first collaboration board in 2012, the Jones / Christenson partnership has grown to include eight models including the binding-less Mountain Surfer, Mind Expander, Ultra Mind Expander, Mind Expander Twin, Storm Chaser, and Lone Wolf. There are also split board models available for both the Storm Chaser and Mind Expander.

Partnerships and Product Collaborations
Chris partners with a wide range of sport and lifestyle brands including Electric Visual, Captain Fin Company, FCS, Axxe Wetsuits, 32, Etnies, Yow and Jones Snowboards. Brands work with Chris both as a rider, but also as a craftsman with an eye for style and design to create unique products for surf and snow including his signature 32 snowboarding boot and signature model surfboard fin designs with Captain Fin and FCS.

Filmography 
For the 2010 film Grey Whale Sessions, Chris joins musician Garret "G. Love" Dutton, surfer Keith Malloy, and artist Tyler Warren on a trip south of the border, where Chris surfs his 12,000 board shaped. In 2016's Distance Between Dreams  from Red Bull Media House, Chris appears in the film working with Ian Walsh on designing and then crafting boards to take on the biggest wave on Maui, Jaws. Chris co-stars in Teton Gravity Research's 2018 film Life Of Glide, designing snowboards with Jeremy Jones, surfing, snowboarding and meeting with legendary southern California surfboard shaper and one of Chris' mentors Skip Frye.

Outside the Shaping Bay 
In 2010 and 2013, Chris successfully competed in the Molokai 2 Oahu paddle world championship – a formidable 32-mile Kaiwi Channel that separates the islands of Molokai and Oahu. Chris races on the American Historic Racing Motorcycle Association, Hell on Wheels and California Vintage Motocross circuits. Having golfed in High School on the Junior PGA, including a few second place finishes to Tiger Woods, Chris went on to play in college and maintains a 4.7 handicap today.

Current Life 
Chris currently splits his time between North County San Diego, Cocoa Beach, FL and Swall Meadows, CA, near Bishop, CA. When Chris isn't working, you will find him racing vintage motorcycles, golfing at his home golf course, surfing the local breaks of North San Diego County, or heading north on 395 to his cabin in the eastern Sierra mountains.

External links
 Christenson Surfboards Official Website 
 Icons of Surf: Chris Christenson
 A Blog by Chris Christenson
 chris-christenson_108101/ Influencers: Chris Christenson
 Jones Snowboards: Stormchaser
 Jones Snowboards: Mountain Surfer
 captures-second- wsl-big- wave-title Greg Long Captures Second WSL Big Wave Title

References

1973 births
Living people
Surfboard shapers